Heather A. Williams is a scholar of African American studies and lawyer. She serves as Presidential Professor and Professor of Africana Studies at the University of Pennsylvania.

Heather Andrea Williams moved to the United States from Jamaica when she was 11 years old. She attended Saint Ann's School in Brooklyn, New York, then Harvard College, graduating in 1978, then earned a J.D. from Harvard in 1981. She practiced law in the public sector, serving as an assistant attorney general and section chief for the State of New York and as a trial attorney in the Civil Rights Division of the U.S. Department of Justice.

After teaching history at Saint Ann's School for two years, she earned a Ph.D. in American Studies from Yale University in 2002. She was a post-doctoral fellow at Smith College for two years, then taught in the history department at the University of North Carolina at Chapel Hill from 2004 to 2014, when she was named Presidential Professor at the University of Pennsylvania.

Her book Help Me to Find My People: The African American Search for Family Lost in Slavery (2012), about ads placed after emancipation to reunify families, was described as "a superbly researched and engaging analysis" by John G. Cox, though Williams's writing was criticized for engaging "only very slightly with extant scholarship".

Works
 Self-Taught: African American Education in Slavery and Freedom (University of North Carolina Press, 2005)
 Help Me to Find My People: The African American Search for Family Lost in Slavery (University of North Carolina Press, 2012)
 American Slavery: A Very Short Introduction (Oxford University Press, forthcoming)

References

Year of birth missing (living people)
Living people
University of Pennsylvania people
Harvard Law School alumni
African-American lawyers
American lawyers
Yale College alumni
Duke University faculty
Harvard College alumni
Historians of slavery
Jamaican emigrants to the United States
Saint Ann's School (Brooklyn) alumni
21st-century African-American people